The 1994 Espirito Santo Trophy took place 28 September – 1 October at Le Golf National in Guyancourt south-west of Paris, France.

It was the 16th women's golf World Amateur Team Championship for the Espirito Santo Trophy and 30-year anniversary of the inaugural event in 1964, which also was held in France, close to Paris. At the time of the 1994 championship, its initiator in 1964, Lally Segard, retired from her position, after serving for 30 years, as chairperson of the women's committee of the organizing World Amateur Golf Council, when the championship returned to her home town.

The tournament was a 72-hole stroke play team event with 29 team entries, each with three players. The best two scores for each round counted towards the team total.

The United States team won the Trophy for their 12th title, beating South Korea by four strokes. South Korea earned the silver medal while the Sweden team took the bronze on third place another stroke back. Defending champions Spain finished fourth, one shot from third place.

The individual title went to Wendy Ward, United States, whose score of 10-under-par, 278, was two strokes ahead of Sarah Beautell, Spain.

Teams 
29 teams entered the event and completed the competition. Each team had three players.

Results 

Sources:

Individual leaders 
There was no official recognition for the lowest individual scores.

References

External links 
World Amateur Team Championships on International Golf Federation website

Espirito Santo Trophy
Golf tournaments in France
Espirito Santo Trophy
Espirito Santo Trophy
Espirito Santo Trophy
Espirito Santo Trophy